El forastero is a 1937  Argentine film directed by Antonio Ber Ciani.

Cast
Ángel Magaña   
Enrique Muiño   
Elías Alippi   
Rosa Contreras

External links

1937 films
1930s Spanish-language films
Argentine black-and-white films
Films directed by Antonio Ber Ciani
1930s Argentine films